Skyfall is a 2012 James Bond film starring Daniel Craig.

Skyfall may also refer to:

Music 
 "Skyfall" (song), the theme song for the 2012 film of the same name, performed by Adele
 Skyfall: Original Motion Picture Soundtrack, the soundtrack for the film of the same name
 "Skyfall", a 2017 song by One Ok Rock
 "Skyfall", a song by Helloween from their self-titled 2021 studio album 
 "Skyfall", a song by Travis Scott featuring Young Thug from the album Days Before Rodeo

Books 
 Skyfall (novel), a 2004 novel by Catherine Asaro in the Saga of the Skolian Empire series
 Skyfall, a 1976 novel by Harry Harrison
 Skyfall, a 2007 novel by Anthony Eaton in the Darklands Trilogy
Legends of Skyfall, a series of adventure books by David Tant
 The Sky Fall series by Shannon Messenger

Other 
 A bar at the top of the Mandalay Bay resort hotel
 SSC-X-9 Skyfall, the NATO reporting name for the 9M730 Burevestnik

See also 
 Spyfall (disambiguation)
 Earthfall (disambiguation)
 Rockfall
 Skyshine